Forino is a town and comune in the province of Avellino, Campania, southern Italy.

Geography
The town, located on a hillside between Salerno and Avellino, borders with the municipalities of Bracigliano, Contrada, Monteforte Irpino, Montoro, Moschiano and Quindici.

History
On 8 May 663 AD the town was the scene of a battle between the Byzantine army of Constans II and the Lombard army of Romuald I of Benevento, son of Grimoald I and duke of Benevento.
According to legend, St. Michael made an apparition in this battle on the side of the Lombards. After this crushing defeat, Constans retired to Naples and gave up his attempts to expel the Lombards from south Italy.

According to other sources, the battle took place at Calore Irpino, where the Calore river joins with the Volturno.

References

External links

 Official website 

Cities and towns in Campania